The 2021–22 Edmonton Oilers season was the 43rd season for the National Hockey League (NHL) franchise that was established on June 22, 1979, and 50th season overall, including their play in the World Hockey Association (WHA). On April 22, 2022, the Oilers clinched a playoff berth after a 6–3 win against the Colorado Avalanche.

Standings

Divisional standings

Conference standings

Schedule and results

Preseason
The preseason schedule was published on July 20, 2021.

Regular season
The regular season schedule was released on July 22, 2021.

Playoffs

Player statistics

Skaters

Goaltenders

†Denotes player spent time with another team before joining the Oilers. Stats reflect time with the Oilers only.
‡Denotes player was traded mid-season. Stats reflect time with the Oilers only.

Awards and honours

Milestones

Transactions
The Oilers have been involved in the following transactions during the 2021–22 season.

Trades

Notes:
 Chicago will receive a second-round pick in 2022 if Edmonton reaches the 2022 Stanley Cup Finals and Keith is among the top-four defensemen on the Oilers in time-on-ice during the first three rounds of the playoffs; otherwise Chicago will receive a third-round pick in 2022.
 Montreal will instead receive Edmonton's 2nd-round pick in 2023 if Edmonton reaches the 2022 Stanley Cup Finals.

Players acquired

Notes:
 Contract starts in the 2022-23 season.

Players lost

Signings

Draft picks

Below are the Edmonton Oilers' selections at the 2021 NHL Entry Draft, which were held on July 23 to 24, 2021. It was held virtually via Video conference call from the NHL Network studio in Secaucus, New Jersey.

References

Edmonton Oilers seasons
Edmonton Oilers
Oilers